The 1983–84 Villanova Wildcats men's basketball team represented Villanova University during the 1983–84 NCAA Division I men's basketball season. The head coach was Rollie Massimino. The team played its home games at Villanova Field House in Villanova, Pennsylvania, and was a member of the Big East Conference.  The team finished tied for second in the Big East regular season standings and reached the second round of the NCAA tournament before falling to Illinois. Villanova finished with a 19–12 record (12–4 Big East).

Roster

Schedule and results

|-
!colspan=9 style=| Regular season

|-
!colspan=9 style=| Big East tournament

|-
!colspan=9 style=| NCAA tournament

Rankings

References

Villanova
Villanova
Villanova Wildcats men's basketball seasons
1983 in sports in Pennsylvania
1984 in sports in Pennsylvania